Petrie railway station is located on the North Coast line in Queensland, Australia. It serves the suburb of Petrie in the Moreton Bay Region. It opened as North Pine railway station in1888 after the nearby North Pine River and was renamed Petrie railway station (after local pioneer Thomas Petrie) in 1911.

The station has five platforms. As part of the Redcliffe Peninsula line, the station was expanded with a new island platform built east of the existing platforms. It opened along with the rest of the line on 4 October 2016. As part of the project, a third track was added south of the station to Lawnton. North of the station, the Redcliffe Peninsula line branches off.

Services 
Petrie is served by all City network services from Gympie North, Nambour, Caboolture & Kippa-Ring to Brisbane, many continuing to Ipswich, Rosewood and Springfield Central.

Services by platform

Transport links
Prior to the October 2016 opening of the Redcliffe Peninsula line, Petrie station was served by 10 bus routes connecting it to nearby suburbs, but after the opening only two remain.

Hornibrook Bus Lines operate two routes via Petrie station:
680: Redcliffe to Westfield Chermside
686: to Frenchs Forest

References

External links

Petrie station Queensland Rail
Petrie station Queensland's Railways on the Internet

Railway stations in Moreton Bay Region
Shire of Pine Rivers
North Coast railway line, Queensland